Madueke is a surname. Notable people with the surname include:

Allison Madueke (born 1944), Nigerian naval officer
Diezani Alison-Madueke (born 1960), Nigerian politician
Noni Madueke (born 2002), British footballer

Surnames of Nigerian origin